Saba Nazir (born 1 November 1992) is a Pakistani cricketer who plays as a right-arm off break bowler. In October 2019, she was named in Pakistan's squad for their series against Bangladesh. She made her Women's Twenty20 International (WT20I) debut for Pakistan, against Bangladesh, on 30 October 2019.

In June 2021, she was named in Pakistan's squad for their series against the West Indies.

References

External links
 
 

1992 births
Living people
People from Muridke
Pakistani women cricketers
Pakistan women Twenty20 International cricketers
Baluchistan women cricketers
Sialkot women cricketers
Higher Education Commission women cricketers